The 2012 Olympic Wrestling European Qualification Tournament was the fourth regional qualifying tournament for the 2012 Olympics and it was held in Sofia, Bulgaria from 20 to 22 April 2012.

The top two wrestlers in each weight class earn a qualification spot for their nation.

Men's freestyle

55 kg
20 April

60 kg
20 April

66 kg
20 April

74 kg
20 April

84 kg
20 April

96 kg
20 April

120 kg
21 April

Men's Greco-Roman

55 kg
21 April

60 kg
21 April

66 kg
21 April

74 kg
21 April

84 kg
21 April

96 kg
22 April

120 kg
22 April

Women's freestyle

48 kg
22 April

55 kg
22 April

63 kg
22 April

72 kg
22 April

References

External links
UWW Database

Europe
Olympic Q European
W
Wrestling Championships